Kishore Tirumala is an Indian film director and screenwriter who works predominantly in Telugu films. Tirumala has directed six films including Nenu.. Sailaja... (2016), Vunnadhi Okate Zindagi (2017), Chitralahari (2019) and Red (2021).

Filmography

Awards and nominations

References

Year of birth missing (living people)
Living people
Indian film directors
Indian screenwriters

Telugu film directors
Film directors from Andhra Pradesh
Film people from Andhra Pradesh
People from Andhra Pradesh
People from Tirupati
People from Chittoor district
Screenwriters from Andhra Pradesh